"Mind War" is the sixth episode of the first season of the science fiction television series, Babylon 5.

Plot
Jason Ironheart, Talia Winters' old instructor at Psi-Corps, arrives at Babylon 5, having recently evaded capture. Psi-Corps agents Alfred Bester and his assistant Kelsey arrive shortly thereafter, and meet with Sinclair, Ivanova, and Winters, warning them that Ironheart is aboard and they need to perform a manhunt for them. To verify that Winters has not yet met him, Bester and Kelsey put Winters under an intense mind probe, but find no contact. Sinclair asks Bester if there is any danger to the station from Ironheart, but Bester assures them he is safe.

Ironheart contacts Winters and asks her to visit. In his guest quarters, he explains that he is an advanced test subject from Psi-Corps, an attempt to raise the telepathic abilities of humans well beyond any known levels. The tests they performed on him gave him advanced telekinesis, for which he believes that Psi-Corps wants to use him as a secret assassin. However, his abilities are growing beyond his control, and as he speaks to Winters, he suffers a "mind quake", shaking the nearby area violently. He begs Winters to leave, after which he creates a psychic barrier around his quarters and several sections around it. Alerted to the situation, Sinclair accosts Bester in lying to him as one of his security men was injured trying to pass the barrier. Some time later, Winters convinces Ironheart to let her in. Ironheart warns Talia that he cannot control his powers and must leave the station. Winters discreetly relays this to Sinclair, who agrees to meet with Ironheart; after hearing his story, Sinclair agrees to help him escape. He has security clear a path to the docking bay, but Bester learns of this and attempts to stop them. As both Bester and Kelsey places Ironheart under a psychic assault, but Ironheart resists and uses his powers to psychically destroy Kelsey. Sinclair knocks Bester out, giving Winters time to escort Ironheart to his ship. Once launched, Ironheart's powers fully transform him into an ethereal being. He thanks Sinclair for his help and gives Winters a "gift" before his form departs. Later, Sinclair convinces Bester to lie in his report, that Ironheart was killed in his ship, otherwise he will threaten to show how Bester lied to him. That evening, in her quarters, Winters finds she now has primitive telekinesis.

Meanwhile, Catherine Sakai is told of a planet named Sigma 957 which an excavation company would like a survey of, willing to pay her a handsome sum for it. As she prepares, Narn ambassador G'Kar warns her not to go, as the planet is inhospitable and not worth the effort, but she goes anyway. When she arrives, a ship of alien origin passes hers in orbit before disappearing, and her ship loses power, causing her orbit to decay. However, she is rescued in time by two Narn fighters summoned to help her by G'Kar. Back on Babylon 5 she asks G'Kar why he helped, and he vaguely passes on a sound reason. She also asks about the ship, but G'Kar deflects this question as well, saying that there are beings that have been in the galaxy much longer than they have, and compares her encounter to that of an ant being picked up by a human - they might not even know she was there.

Production, visual and sound effects 
Actor Walter Koenig, who played the recurring role of Psi Cop Alfred Bester, is best known for he portrayal of Pavel Chekov in the original Star Trek series and films. Koenig was originally offered the role of Knight Two in the episode 'And the Sky full of Stars', but was unable to do so because of health issues. Koenig was shifted to the role of Bester in this episode.

Catherine Sakai was played by Julia Nickson, who had previously played the female lead in Rambo: First Blood Part II.

Jason Ironheart was played by William Allen Young, an actor and director who has starred in over 100 television, stage, and film projects, including two Academy Award-nominated films, A Soldier's Story and District 9.

Bester's aide Kelsey was played by English actress Felicity Waterman, who played Vanessa Hunt in the series Knot's Landing; and played Lt. Abigail Hawling on the series Pensacola: Wings of Gold.

The Babylon 5 makeup department involved in this episode – consisting of Everett Burrell, Greg Funk, Mary Kay Morse, Ron Pipes and John Vulich – won the 1994 Emmy Award for Outstanding Individual Achievement in Makeup for a Series for the previous episode of the season, "The Parliament of Dreams"

For its visual effects scenes, Babylon 5 pioneered the use of computer-generated imagery (CGI) scenes – instead of using more expensive physical models – in a television series.<ref name="Britt">{{cite web |url=https://www.syfy.com/syfywire/5-things-babylon-5-did-that-changed-science-fiction-forever |title=5 Things that Babylon 5 did that changed science fiction forever. |last=Britt |first=Ryan |date=11 July 2019 |website=www.syfy.com |publisher=SYFY Media LLC. |access-date= |url-status=dead |archive-url=https://web.archive.org/web/20211009164702/https://www.syfy.com/syfywire/5-things-babylon-5-did-that-changed-science-fiction-forever |archive-date= 2021-10-09 |quote=And though this may seem shocking now, in the early and mid-'90s, CGI was not the default for sci-fi special effects. Most big sci-fi shows and movies (like Star Trek) all still used physical models, which are notoriously more expensive. But all of Babylon 5'''s spaceships and space stations were made in a computer.}}</ref> This also enabled motion effects which are difficult to create using models, such as the rotation of fighter craft along multiple axes, or the rotation and banking of a virtual camera. The visual effects were created by Foundation Imaging using 24 Commodore Amiga 2000 computers with LightWave 3D software and Video Toaster cards, 16 of which were dedicated to rending each individual frame of CGI, with each frame taking on average 45 minutes to render. In-house resource management software managed the workload of the Amiga computers to ensure that no machine was left idle during the image rendering process.

The scenes of the rail car travelling through the interior of the station were created by effects designer Eric Chauvin. The production team built a set of the rail car, which was filmed in front of blue screen, and the core background was rendered and composited by Chauvin.

The Starfury fighter design seen in the episode was designed by Steve Burg as a function-driven design for a plausible zero-gravity fighter. The positioning of the four engine pods at the extremities of the craft was inspired by Ron Cobb's design for the Gunstar fighter from The Last Starfighter. The basic shape of the Starfury's wings was inspired by an earlier unused design by Burg for a military robot fighting machine, which he had originally designed for Terminator 2. This was merged with the multi-engined configuration to form the Starfury design. Burg points out that the wings/struts were not aerodynamic: they were there to lever the engines away from the center of mass.

Music for the title sequence and the episode was provided by the series’ composer, Christopher Franke.  Franke developed themes for each of the main characters, the station, for space in general, and for the alien races, endeavoring to carry a sense of the character of each race.

Reviews
Rowan Kaiser, writing in The A.V. Club, identifies transcendence as a key theme of the episode. He singles out an exchange between Ironheart and Talia: "'I am becoming.' 'Becoming what?' 'Everything.' And he does. The episode ends with him becoming an awkward CGI energy being, essentially a god." Kaiser also identifies that how G 'Kar describes the beings at Sigma 957 is going to apply equally to Ironheart.

Elias Rosner, writing in Multiversity Comics, highlights the performance of Walter Koenig as Bester. Rosner writes, "He does a great job of making telepathy and, well, everything look menacing and shady. He's transparently evil but not in a way that's cliché or over-the-top. You never know if he's hiding around a corner, listening in, and he makes sure you know that. He's the right amount of cold evil and gives just the best deliveries of the episode. He is Bester."<ref name="Rosner">{{cite web |url=http://www.multiversitycomics.com/tv/babylon-5-mind-war  |title=Five Thoughts on Babylon 5's 'Mind War.' |last=Rosner |first=Elias |date=27 June 2018 |website=Multiversity Comics |publisher=Matthew Meylikhov |access-date= |quote= |url-status= |archive-url= |archive-date= }}</ref>

Jules-Pierre Malartre, writing in the science fiction review site, Den of Geek'', notes that the episode is episode is "heavy on sci-fi and social issues", and deals with concepts such as "equality and the potential of human evolution." Malartre also highlights Walter Koenig's performance as Bester: "Babylon 5 would produce a number of villains over the course of its five seasons, but Bester comes out as the best of the lot, thanks in great part to Koenig's unique performance, at once charismatic and chilling."

References

External links

Babylon 5 episodes
1994 American television episodes
Television episodes about psychic powers